Lauren Andino (born July 7, 1986) is an American artist, musician, and co-founder of DL Skateboards. Raised in Columbia, South Carolina, Andino moved to Brooklyn, New York as a young adult where she played in several bands. 
She is currently the singer and guitarist for the shoegaze pop band Tremours with drummer Glenn Fryatt. Since August of 2021, she has been playing guitar and touring with L.A. Witch.

In 2015, Andino graduated from Southwestern Law School.

She currently resides in Los Angeles, CA.

DL Skateboards
Andino formed DL Skateboards with Derek Mabra in 2011. 
Of her inspiration for starting the company, she told Vogue Magazine:
In the 1960s, if you wanted a skateboard, you carved and painted it yourself, and that is what we make, a classic skateboard with a modern twist. 
Andino designs and paints each DL Skateboard collection.  In an interview with The New York Daily News, she explained:
A lot of the designs come from '60s, surf style or a classic kid toys, and they are hand-painted. So even if you get the same design, each board is different.
In 2014, Marie Claire Magazine named her one of 5 Women Running the Show Behind Iconic Male Brands along with executives from Anheuser Busch, Playboy, and ESPN. The Daily Beast profiled her as a "skater chick turned entrepreneur".

References

American women artists
Female skateboarders
1986 births
Living people
Alternative rock guitarists
Alternative rock singers
Singers from South Carolina
Guitarists from South Carolina
21st-century American women singers
21st-century American singers
21st-century American women guitarists
21st-century American guitarists
Shoegaze musicians